Rhopobota latisocia is a moth of the family Tortricidae. It is found in Vietnam.

The wingspan is 12.5 mm. The ground colour of the forewings is whitish mixed with greyish brown and spotted grey brown. The markings are reduced to an oblique streak terminating with a spot at the end of the median cell. The hindwings are brownish cream with a paler cilia and a large subcostal area of blackish transformed scent scales.

Etymology
The male refers to shape of the socius and is derived from Latin lata (meaning broad).

References

Moths described in 2009
Eucosmini
Moths of Asia
Taxa named by Józef Razowski